Eresus, also called ladybird spiders, is a genus of  velvet spiders that was first described by Charles Athanase Walckenaer in 1805. Members of the genus formerly called Eresus cinnaberinus or Eresus niger are now placed in one of three species: Eresus kollari, Eresus sandaliatus and Eresus moravicus.

Description 
They resemble both jumping spiders and the spiders in the Palpimanidae, as their bodies look similar, and are as well rather velvety. Males of this genus have a red abdomen, with black spotting, usually taking the form of 4 black spots. While the rest of the body is usually black, with some reddish areas or white areas. Females of this genus are duly colored usually being a grey, brown or black color. Majority have a range of full body length to reach 8.5 to 20mm, as well as a distinct prosomal length of 3.6 to 6.1 mm. Some species having some yellow coloration, thought they are still significantly duller then the males.

Identification 
Males of this genus can usually be distinguished by their unique abdominal pattern. Which in the lateral areas has two pairs of black patches which is surrounded by some reddish coloration. Sometimes they also have an extra pair.  Females are harder to distinguish, with a species specific dedicated identification section being needed.

Distribution 
They are found in Europe, Asia and Africa, usually in non-forested warm and dry habitats. Their life cycle is completed in 3–4 years, after they undergo dispersion and reach a juvenile state and turn into predators.  Some species build a vertical burrow which is lined with silk, the opening being camouflaged with a silken sheet of debris. While some species don't build a burrow and just make their tubes under stones.

Species
 it contains twenty-four species:
Eresus adaleari Zamani & Szűts, 2020 - Iran
Eresus albopictus Simon, 1873 – Morocco, Algeria
Eresus bifasciatus Ermolajev, 1937 – Russia (South Siberia)
Eresus crassitibialis Wunderlich, 1987 – Canary Is.
Eresus granosus Simon, 1895 – Russia (West Siberia), China
Eresus hermani Kovács, Prazsák, Eichardt, Vári & Gyurkovics, 2015 – Hungary
Eresus kollari Rossi, 1846 – Europe, Turkey, Caucasus, Russia (Europe to Far East), Iran, Central Asia
Eresus k. frontalis Latreille, 1819 – Spain
Eresus k. ignicomis Simon, 1914 – France (Corsica)
Eresus k. latefasciatus Simon, 1911 – Algeria
Eresus k. tricolor Simon, 1873 – France (Corsica)
Eresus lavrosiae Mcheidze, 1997 – Georgia
Eresus lishizheni 2021 - China
Eresus moravicus Řezáč, 2008 – Austria, Hungary, Czech Rep., Slovakia, Albania
Eresus pharaonis Walckenaer, 1837 – Egypt
Eresus robustus Franganillo, 1918 – Spain
Eresus rotundiceps Simon, 1873 – Ukraine, Turkmenistan
Eresus ruficapillus C. L. Koch, 1846 – Italy (Sicily)
Eresus sandaliatus (Martini & Goeze, 1778) – Europe
Eresus sedilloti Simon, 1881 – Portugal, Spain
Eresus solitarius Simon, 1873 – Mediterranean
Eresus tristis Kroneberg, 1875 - Kazakhstan
Eresus walckenaeri Brullé, 1832 – Mediterranean
Eresus w. moerens C. L. Koch, 1846 – Afghanistan

References

External links

Spiders of Europe
Araneomorphae genera
Eresidae
Spiders of Africa
Spiders of Asia
Taxa named by Charles Athanase Walckenaer